Events during the year 1117 in Italy.

Events
 Stephen II of Hungary reconquers Dalmatia from Venice

Deaths
 Faritius

Sources
Cosmas of Prague: The Chronicle of the Czechs (Translated with an introduction and notes by Lisa Wolverton) (2009). The Catholic University of America Press. .
Deeds of John and Manuel Comnenus by John Kinnamos (Translated by Charles M. Brand) (1976). Columbia University Press. .
O City of Byzantium, Annals of Niketas Choniatēs (Translated by Harry J. Magoulias) (1984). Wayne State University Press. .
The Hungarian Illuminated Chronicle: Chronica de Gestis Hungarorum (Edited by Dezső Dercsényi) (1970). Corvina, Taplinger Publishing. .

Kelly, S. E. 2000. Charters of Abingdon, part 1. Anglo-Saxon Charters 7.

References

Years of the 12th century in Italy
Italy
Italy